Jan Groenendijk (born 7 September 1998 in Wageningen) is a Dutch draughts player who ranked second at the 2015 World Draughts Championship in Emmen. Winner Salou Open -2015. He also won the Dutch championship twice (2020, 2022). Groenendijk is an International grandmaster.

World championship
 2015 (2nd place)
 2016 (2nd place)
 2017 (7th place in semifinal B)
 2019 (4 place)
 2021 (4 place)

European championship
 2012 (26th place)
 2014 (9th place)
 2018 (11th place)

External links
Profile Jan Groenendijk at site KNDB

References 

1998 births
Living people
Dutch draughts players
Players of international draughts
People from Wageningen
Sportspeople from Gelderland